Ali Abdi Farah is a Somali professional football manager. From October 2003 to December 2005 and from September 2008 to December 2009 he coached the Somalia national football team.

References

External links

Year of birth missing (living people)
Living people
Somalian football managers
Somalia national football team managers
Place of birth missing (living people)